Jack Gilbert Hills (born 15 May 1943) is a theorist of stellar dynamics. He worked on the Oort cloud; the inner part of it, the Hills cloud, was named after him.  

He studied at the University of Kansas, where he was awarded an A.B. in 1966 and an M.A. in 1967. He was also awarded an M.S. by the University of Michigan, Ann Arbor.

He spent much of his professional career at Los Alamos National Laboratory, which named him a Laboratory Fellow in 1998.

Also the Hills mechanism in astrophysics is named after him. He proposed the mechanism in the 1980s.

He was inducted a Fellow of the American Physical Society in 1983. His citation read that he was proposed for "seminal theoretical work on the physics of dense stellar systems and in particular for proposing and developing his model of the energy source of quasars."

References

External links 
 
 

1943 births
Living people
University of Kansas alumni
University of Michigan alumni
American astronomers
20th-century American mathematicians
Los Alamos National Laboratory personnel
Fellows of the American Physical Society
21st-century American mathematicians